The following is a list of programs distributed by ABS-CBN, a Philippine television network. The network is headquartered in ABS-CBN Broadcasting Center, Diliman, Quezon City.

All programs are currently syndicated to A2Z, All TV, ANC, Cinema One, Cine Mo!, GMA, iQIYI, iWantTFC, Jeepney TV, Kapamilya Channel, Kapamilya Online Live, KTX, Kumu, Light TV Network, Metro Channel, Myx, Netflix, PIE, TeleRadyo, TV5, The Filipino Channel, WeTV iflix, Viu, YouTube and other various networks and platforms.

Current original programs

Newscast
 Kabayan 
 News Patrol 
 Sakto 
 TeleRadyo Balita 
 The World Tonight 
 TV Patrol 
 TV Patrol Weekend

Drama
Anthology
 Ipaglaban Mo! 

Series
 Dirty Linen 
 FPJ's Batang Quiapo 
 The Iron Heart

Animated
 Hero City Kids Force

Variety
 ASAP Natin 'To 
 It's Showtime

Game
 I Can See Your Voice

Reality
 The Voice Kids

Talk
 Magandang Buhay

Religious
 Kapamilya Daily Mass 
 The Healing Eucharist: Sunday TV Mass

Current acquired programs

Anime series
 Haikyū!! To the Top 
 Naruto Shippuden (season 10)

Variety
 Tropang LOL

Documentary
 Rated Korina

Foreign drama
 Dive 
 The Great Show 
 Never Let Me Go

Current reruns for original programs

Drama
 Ang sa Iyo Ay Akin 
 A Soldier's Heart 
 Be Careful with My Heart 
 Bridges of Love 
 Doble Kara 
 Momay 
 Mula sa Puso 
 Sana Dalawa ang Puso 
 The Better Half 
 Till I Met You 
 Wansapanataym

Educational
 Agos 
 ATBP: Awit, Titik at Bilang na Pambata 
 Bayani 
 Carlo's Blog 
 Epol/Apple 
 Estudyantipid 
 Gab to Go 
 Hiraya Manawari 
 Kasaysayan TV 
 K-High 
 MathDali 
 Math-Tinik 
 Puno ng Buhay 
 Ready, Set, Read 
 Salam 
 Sine'skwela 
 Wikaharian 
 Wow!

Kids-oriented
 Team Yey!

Comedy
 Goin' Bulilit

Current affairs
 KBYN: Kaagapay ng Bayan

Current reruns for acquired programs

Anime series
 Charlotte 
 Judy Abbott 
 Little Women II 
 Remi, Nobody's Girl 
 The Flying House

Cartoons
 Masha and the Bear 
 Mr. Bean 
 Oddbods 
 Robocar Poli 
 Superbook Reimagined

Comedy
 Oh My Dad!

Foreign drama
 2gether: The Series 
 A Tale of Thousand Stars 
 Bad Buddy 
 Baker Boys 
 Codename: Terrius 
 Come and Hug Me 
 Come To Me 
 Count Your Lucky Stars 
 Dark Blue Kiss 
 Enchanté 
 F4 Thailand: Boys Over Flowers 
 Flower Crew: Dating Agency 
 Hotel del Luna 
 I'm Tee, Me Too 
 Not Me 
 Still 2gether 
 The Shipper 
 Theory of Love

Current online-based programs

Commentary

Reality

Game

Musical

Talk

Informative

Digital program

Religious

See also
List of programs broadcast by ABS-CBN
List of ABS-CBN drama series
List of ABS-CBN specials aired

Notes

References

ABS-CBN
ABS-CBN Corporation
Lists of television series by network
Philippine television-related lists